Homo erectus is a rock/pop album by the Austrian band Schürzenjäger.

Track listing
"Der Fan-Song The fan song") – Müssig/C. Leis-Bendorff – 4:26
"Homo erectus (Rein in die Höhle)" "Homo erectus (Into the cave) – Müssig/C. Leis-Bendorff – 3:43
"Keine Angst" ("No fear") – Moll/Meinunger – 3:44
"Für mi bist du's" ("You're the one for me") – Müssig – 4:26
"Woaßt, wia des is?" ("Do you know, how it is like that?") – Klüter/Meinunger – 3:37
"I woaß net, was i mach" ("I don't know what I'm doing") – Müssig – 2:20
"Rio Grande" – Müssig – 4:08
"Der Sagibineda-Reggae" – Harwin – 2:50
"Koane Mädels nirgendwo" ("No girls anywhere") – Müssig/C. Leis-Bendorff – 2:48
"Da draußen is Sommer" ("Summer is out there") – Klüter/Meinunger – 4:13
"Die tuan was für die Leut" ("They do something for the people") – 2:56
"Das verlorene Paradies" ("The lost paradise") – Müssig/Kunze – 4:33
"Bäriger Boarischer ("Bear like Bavarian") – Müssig/C. Leis-Bendorff – 2:14
"Samba Republica Banana – Müssig – 3:26
"Immer gradaus" ("Ever straightforward") – Beyerl/Schlüter – 3:31
"Einmal, eines Tages" ("One of these days") – Müssig – 4:53

Charts

Weekly charts

Year-end charts

References

1997 albums